Qiaozi Town, is a town in southern Huairou District, Beijing, China. It shares border with Bohai Town in the north, Hauirou and Miaocheng Towns in the east, Beishicao and Xingshou Towns in the south, as well as Yanshou and Jiuduhe Towns in the west. Its population was 25,076 as of 2020.

History

Administrative divisions 
As of 2021, Qiaozi Town administers 25 subdivisions, of which 1 is a community and 24 are villages:

Gallery

See also 

 List of township-level divisions of Beijing

References 

Huairou District
Towns in Beijing